The 2022 FEI World Cup Finals for both dressage and show jumping are scheduled to be held April 6-10, 2022 in Leipzig, Germany. The event is set to be held in the Leipzig Trade Fair and will mark the conclusion of the 2021-22 Dressage and Show jumping World Cup Seasons.

Background 
Due to the COVID-19 pandemic, the 2020 FEI World Cup Finals in Las Vegas got cancelled. It was the first time that the FEI World Cup Finals got cancelled since their inclusion in 1978 for show jumping, and 1985 for dressage. The World Cup Finals were set to return the following year in Gothenburg, Sweden, however they also got cancelled on short notice, following the EHV-1 outbreak in Europe.

As with the previous season, the COVID-19 pandemic affected the 2021-22 World Cup Seasons in both dressage and jumping, with several qualifying events getting cancelled during the season. Amidst the event cancellations, FEI revised the World Cup Finals qualification rules in February 2022, allowing athletes to qualify with fewer number of results attained. The rule change controversially allowed Helen Langehanenberg to qualify over Frederic Wandres at the end of the Western European League for dressage. Wandres was the season's leader until the number of counting results was reduced from four to three.

Leipzig previously hosted the 2011 FEI World Cup Finals.

Dressage

Qualification 
The list of qualified athletes was released on March 16, 2022.

Grand Prix Freestyle

Show jumping

Qualification 
The list of qualified athletes was released on March 18, 2022.

Final

Driving

Vaulting

Individual Female

Individual Male

Pas-de-Deux

References

External links 
 Leipzig World Cup (English / German)

2022 in equestrian
Dressage World Cup
Show Jumping World Cup
2022 in German sport
Sports competitions in Leipzig
FEI World Cup Finals
Equestrian sports competitions in Germany
International sports competitions hosted by Germany